The 1911 European Rowing Championships were rowing championships held on Lake Como in the Italian Lombardy region on 10 September. The competition was for men only and they competed in five boat classes (M1x, M2x, M2+, M4+, M8+).

Medal summary

References

European Rowing Championships
European Rowing Championships
Rowing
Rowing
European Rowing Championships
Rowing competitions in Italy
Como